Akrosida floribunda is native to the Dominican Republic. It grows as a tree, bearing young branches that lose their stellate pubescence with age. Leaves - alternate, broadly ovate and palmately seven-veined - bear subtle, crenate-dentate teeth and abaxial surfaces colored more palely than their adaxial surfaces. Flowers - arranged in axillary fascicles - bear a gamosepalous but lobed calyx and clawed petals with or without two basal auriculae.

References

Malveae
Plants described in 2007
Trees of the Dominican Republic
Endemic flora of the Dominican Republic